NBA Live 10 is the 2009 installment in the NBA Live series, developed by EA Canada and published by Electronic Arts. Dwight Howard of the Orlando Magic is the cover athlete. It was released in 2009 for PlayStation 3, Xbox 360, PSP, and iOS (the latter under the title NBA Live by EA Sports). NBA Live 10 was to be followed by NBA Elite 11 which was cancelled in late 2010. The NBA Live series was discontinued for four years until NBA Live 14 in 2013, and was the last installment available for the PlayStation 3, Xbox 360 and PSP.

Features
A new training facility called "The Hanger" was included as well.  There were many improvements to the details of the players including their tattoos, hair, shoes, uniforms, signature shots, and moves. Also, "Dynamic DNA," introduced in NBA Live 09, was improved. NBA Live 10 also contained 31 authentic, fully licensed FIBA teams. This was the first year that pre-game rituals were in an NBA Live game.

Due to NBA Elite 11 being canceled, EA released free DLC for NBA Live 10, including free roster updates for the 2010–11 NBA season and free daily Dynamic DNA updates, for the entire 2010–11 NBA season.

Demo
EA Sports announced on September 11, 2009 that a playable demo of NBA Live 10 was available for download on Xbox Live Marketplace for all Xbox LIVE Gold subscribers. In the beginning of the demo, the player will see several NBA stars that can be playable only in "The Hangar," with the exception of Dwight Howard and Kobe Bryant. As they are playing, LeBron James enters while the other players give him a warm welcome, especially Dwight Howard, with a friendly hug. The playable players in The Hangar are Dwight Howard, Kobe Bryant, Dwyane Wade, LeBron James, Chris Paul, Carmelo Anthony, Amar'e Stoudemire, and Brandon Roy. In the game menus, you can either play a quick game, view credits, or leave the demo. When playing the quick game, the player's choices are limited. The user can either play as the Orlando Magic (away team) or the Los Angeles Lakers (home team). The atmosphere is set to "NBA Finals" and cannot be changed, to show the new feature of crowd atmosphere. The difficulty can be changed, but the game is restricted to four-minute quarters, and the user cannot play past the first half. All the in-game features are available, and to show another feature, demo features a throwback jersey available for both teams. For the Magic, an away jersey worn from 1994 to '95, and for the Lakers, a home jersey worn from 1961 to '62. The demo was made available to Xbox LIVE Silver members and on the PlayStation Network.

Jerseys
EA sports Live team added new jerseys for the upcoming games for the 2009–10 NBA season and throwback jerseys that were played in the NBA seasons in 1980s and 1990s.  On November 12, 2009, they have revealed the code on an official EA Sports blog for brand new alternate jerseys this season.  The teams that have new alternate jerseys include the Atlanta Hawks, Dallas Mavericks, Houston Rockets, and Memphis Grizzlies. On December 2, 2009, another official EA Sports blog has revealed that there is another new code to unlock throwback jerseys including the Cleveland Cavaliers, Golden State Warriors, Minnesota Timberwolves, Orlando Magic, Philadelphia 76ers, Portland Trail Blazers, Toronto Raptors, and Utah Jazz.

Downloadable content 
On December 20, EA released a DLC for the game on the PlayStation Store and Xbox Live Marketplace called "NBA Live 10 Holiday shoe pack". The DLC featured 23 new shoes which were added in-game.

NBA Player Takeover
NBA Player Takeover is an official blog from EA Sports that features certain players every week who have been impressive throughout the season and they use NBA Live 10 to show screenshots and examples of that player.

FIBA teams
Players can compete in an international tournament using one of 31 available FIBA national teams.

Reception

The PlayStation 3 and Xbox 360 versions received "favorable" reviews, while the PSP version received "mixed" reviews, according to video game review aggregator Metacritic.  In Japan, Famitsu gave the PS3 and Xbox 360 versions a score of one eight and three sevens for a total of 29 out of 40.

See also
NBA Live (video game series)
NCAA Basketball 10
NBA 2K10

References

External links
EA Sports Official site

2009 video games
Electronic Arts games
HB Studios games
IOS games
Multiplayer and single-player video games
NBA Live
PlayStation 3 games
PlayStation Portable games
Video games developed in Canada
Video games set in 2009
Video games set in 2010
Xbox 360 games